James Richard Wesley Boyce OBE (born 21 March 1944) is a former Vice-President of FIFA. He was the president of Northern Ireland's football organising body, the IFA, from 1995 to 2007.

Boyce played for Ballymena Cricket Club during the 1970s. He was team captain between 1974 and 1978.

Boyce is a supporter of Cliftonville F.C. where he was Chairman until 1998.

Boyce was one of a number of FIFA officials to call for the publication of the Garcia Report into allegations of corruption surrounding Russia and Qatar's bids for the 2018 and 2022 FIFA World Cups.

He was appointed Officer of the Order of the British Empire (OBE) in the 2015 New Year Honours for services to football in Northern Ireland.

References

1944 births
Cricketers from Belfast
FIFA officials
Living people
Association footballers from Northern Ireland
Officers of the Order of the British Empire
Presidents of the Irish Football Association
Association footballers not categorized by position